Legislative elections were held in South Korea on 26 April 1988. The result was a victory for the ruling Democratic Justice Party (DJP), which won 125 of the 299 seats in the National Assembly. Voter turnout was 75.8%. This was the first time in Korean history the ruling party did not win a majority in the National Assembly since 1950. In January 1990, the DJP merged with other two opposition parties, leaving Kim Dae-jung-led Peace Democratic Party to be the sole opposition party.

Political parties

The governing Democratic Justice Party (DJP) had recently elected President Roh Tae-woo. While remaining the largest party, the DJP lost its absolute parliamentary majority. The party was hindered by a stronger opposition and the unpopularity of former party leader and President Chun Doo-hwan. 
  
The opposition Peace Democratic Party led by veteran opposition leader Kim Dae-jung became the second largest party, winning more seats than another opposition Reunification Democratic Party (RDP). This was vindication for Kim Dae-jung, who came had come third in the 1987 South Korean presidential election. However, the election also showed the party's limitations, coming in as third place after DJP and RDP in popular vote and only winning seats in the Honam and Sudogwon, and nowhere outside of them.

For Kim Young-sam's Reunification Democratic Party the election was a major setback, winning third most seats in the parliament. This was after Kim had placed second in the first democratic presidential election, just ahead of Kim Dae-jung.

The New Democratic Republican Party (NDRP) led by former prime Minister Kim Jong-pil came a distant fourth. However, thanks to the failure of the DJP to win an absolute majority, the oppositions emerged as the major powerbrokers in the new National Assembly.

In January 1990, the DJP merged with the parties of Kim Young-sam and Kim Jong-pil to form the Democratic Liberal Party, with the former becoming its nominee in the 1992 presidential elections.

There were 224 constituency seats and 75 at large seats elected from lists in proportion to parties' share of constituency seats.

Results

By city/province

References

External links
1988 elections in South Korea Inter-Parliamentary Union

Legislative elections in South Korea
Parliamentary election